Hauptplatz (German: "Main Square") is the name of a number of squares in German speaking cities:

 Hauptplatz, a square in the city of Ried im Innkreis, Austra
 Hauptplatz (Salzburg), a square, now known as Residenzplatz, in the city of Salzburg, Austria
 Hauptplatz, a square in the city of Wiener Neustadt, Austria

See also
 Main Square (disambiguation)